Summer of Secrets is a 1976 film directed by Jim Sharman and starring Arthur Dignam, Rufus Collins, and Nell Campbell.

Plot
A young couple, Steve and Kym, go to the beach where Steve grew up. They come across Dr Beverley Adams, who is experimenting on the brain and is working to bring back his dead wife, Rachel, to life. Rachel comes alive and wreaks havoc.

Cast
Arthur Dignam as Dr Beverley Adams
Rufus Collins as Bob
Nell Campbell as Kym
Andrew Sharp as Steve
Kate Fitzpatrick as Rachel
Jude Kuring as shop assistant

Production
Sharman was attracted to the script because it was a serious exploration of the Frankenstein legend.

The budget was provided by the Australian Film Commission and Greater Union. The film was shot in late 1975 under the title The Secret of Paradise Beach. Shooting took six weeks.

Reception
Summer of Secrets won several awards including the Jury and Critics' Prizes at the Academy of Science Fiction and Fantasy Films, Paris 1997

References

External links

Clip from film at Rocky Music - a Rocky Horror tribute site
Summer of Secrets at Oz Movies

1976 films
Australian comedy films
1976 comedy films
Films directed by Jim Sharman
1970s English-language films